Richard Greatrex is an English cinematographer. He was nominated for the Academy Award for Best Cinematography for his work on Shakespeare in Love (1998). Other films shot by Greatrex include Mrs Brown (1997), A Knight's Tale (2001), and The Upside of Anger (2005). He has won one BAFTA Award, along with three additional nominations.

References

External links

English cinematographers
Living people
BAFTA winners (people)
Year of birth missing (living people)